is a Japanese video game development company formed in March 1995 by former Telenet Japan employees Yoshiharu Gotanda (programmer, current tri-Ace President), Masaki Norimoto (game designer) and Joe Asanuma (director). The name is a play on words regarding the "three aces" who formed the company. Most of tri-Ace's games have been published by Square Enix (formerly Enix).

The company exclusively makes role-playing video games, and is known for giving their games' action-packed battle systems and deep skill systems. This trademark style began when the founders of tri-Ace originally worked for Telenet Japan's Wolfteam, and had created Tales of Phantasia. This game, published by Namco, is a precursor to tri-Ace's own Star Ocean games in several ways; e.g., an action battle system where the player controls one character and AI controls others in the party and special battle skills that the player can assign to different buttons. Besides the Star Ocean series, they also released Valkyrie Profile in 1999. Their 2010 release of Resonance of Fate, was taken to Sega publishing.

tri-Ace games have sold over 3.8 million copies worldwide as of September 2005. The company's sound programmer Hiroya Hatsushiba formed tri-Crescendo in 1999 which has since developed several games independently of tri-Ace.

Japanese mobile company Nepro Japan acquired tri-Ace in February 2015. Despite being acquired by a company focusing on mobile gaming, tri-Ace will continue developing video games for consoles.

Games developed

References

External links
 
 tri-Ace profile at MobyGames

 
Software companies based in Tokyo
Video game companies established in 1995
Video game development companies
Video game companies of Japan
Japanese companies established in 1995